Maple Valley may refer to:

 Maple Valley, Ontario (disambiguation), multiple locations
 Maple Valley, Indiana
 Maple Valley, Michigan, an unincorporated community
 Maple Valley, Washington
 Maple Valley, Wisconsin
 Maple Valley Township, Iowa
 Maple Valley Township, Buena Vista County, Iowa
 Maple Valley Township, Montcalm County, Michigan
 Maple Valley Township, Sanilac County, Michigan
 Maple Valley Schools, Vermontville, Eaton County, Michigan